Gasconade Township is an inactive township in Laclede County, in the U.S. state of Missouri.

Gasconade Township was established in 1874, taking its name from the Gasconade River.

References

Townships in Missouri
Townships in Laclede County, Missouri